The Pure Hell of St Trinian's is a 1960 British comedy film set in the fictional St Trinian's School.  Directed by Frank Launder and written by him and Sidney Gilliat, it was the third in a series of four films.

Plot 

The St. Trinian's girls burn down the school building and are, subsequently, put on trial at the Old Bailey in London, found guilty, and await sentencing the next day by Judge Slender (Raymond Huntley). This leads to rejoicing at the Ministry of Education, and in Barset, the school's village home, where Sergeant Ruby Gates (Joyce Grenfell) and Superintendent Samuel Kemp-Bird (Lloyd Lamble) can finally plan their marriage, which is predicated on the end of St. Trinian's. However, beautiful sixth-form pupil Rosalie Dawn (Julie Alexander) has been flirting with Slender during the trial, where she gives him her telephone numbers, and continues flirting at the sentencing session. Consequently, when Professor of Philosophy Canford (Cecil Parker) of the University of Baghdad suggests that, rather than punishment, the girls need sympathy, and explains that he has funds to buy a new school building, and with the help of noted educator Matilda Harker-Packer (Irene Handl), the girls can be rehabilitated, Judge Slender ignores the guilty verdict and gives him a year to accomplish his aims. This causes dismay at the Ministry, where Butters (Thorley Walters), on the advice of his psychiatrist, does a pastoral dance to calm his nerves. The revival of St. Trinian's also means the end of Gates' and Kemp-Bird's marriage plans. The girls, led by Prof. Canford, new Headmistress Harker-Packer, and the new teaching staff, move into the former Hannington Manor, now the new St. Trinian's school building.

To demonstrate the positive effects the sympathetic educational approach is having on the girls Harker-Packer, acknowledging it will be a disaster, suggests the school present a cultural festival in a month, featuring a fashion show, a painting demonstration, and a dramatic presentation. Ministry officials Culpepper Brown (Eric Barker) and Butters are invited and their superior, Under Secretary Gore Blackwood (Dennis Price), encourages them to go and make detailed notes about the show, which they all believe will be a fiasco, in the hope that, with their report, they can convince the Minister of Education (John Le Mesurier) to shut the school. The show is indeed a fiasco: the fashions displayed by the girls are scandalous; the action-painting demonstration turns into a paint-flinging fight; and the dramatic presentation by Rosalie is Hamlet's soliloquy accompanied by a striptease. Certain the Minister will close the school when they present their report, Culpepper Brown, Butters and Blackwood are crushed when the Minister explains that the fashions are due to be shown in London, a reputable gallery will exhibit the art, and the Stratford theatre will present the girls' Hamlet. All three now use the pastoral dance to calm their nerves.

Back at St. Trinian's, the sixth-form girls and Flash Harry Cuthbert Edwards (George Cole) see Alphonse O'Reilly (Sidney James), sporting a cowboy-style hat (and immediately dubbed "Wyatt Earp" by the girls), arrive in a big car, stay for a short time and leave. Harry thinks that something is amiss, but doesn't know what. Now Canford suggests that he take the sixth-form girls on a cultural tour of the Greek Islands, which will be financed by his backer, and the Ministry approves the voyage. Kemp-Bird feels there is something fishy going on and gets Sgt. Gates to stowaway on the yacht. Harry also goes along and, one day while he and the girls are on deck, they find that "Wyatt Earp" is also aboard the yacht. This gives Harry a very uneasy feeling: something is amiss. That night, someone – obviously a woman – manages to look at the ship's log and finds that they are off the East African coast. Meanwhile, uneasy at not having seen land for days, Canford confronts O'Reilly regarding their destination and money due to him: O'Reilly tells Canford that he will get no more money and, when they did the deal, he was told their destination. Upset by this answer, he goes to see Harry, but someone knocks at Harry's cabin door, and Canford tells Harry to meet him on deck in a half hour. The interruption was caused by the telegraph operator Octavius (Monte Landis), who has been lured away from his post by a message to him as "Lover Boy", asking him to meet "Lavinia" in the cabin actually occupied by Harry. While Octavius is gone, someone sends a telegraph message. Harry meets Canford on deck but, before they can talk, they notice the smell of gravy and discover Gates, cooking her dinner, in the covered lifeboat next to them. When they hear someone coming, they climb into the lifeboat with Gates. While she explains that they are not near Greece, but off the East African coast, O'Reilly and the ship's captain discover them, and O'Reilly has the lifeboat lowered into the sea. The three begin rowing, eventually spot a desert island and land there as castaways.

Back in Barset, Kemp-Bird receives Gates' telegram and contacts the Ministry, who contact the army. The army sends word of the problem to the only unit in the East Arabian area, a mobile bath unit led by Major Hargreaves (Nicholas Phipps) and Captain Thompson (Cyril Chamberlain), and tells them that a plane carrying supplies, liquor and Ministry of Education officials is on the way. Blackwood sends Culpepper Brown and Butters on the mission, as they are the only Ministry officials who can identify the girls. Back at St. Trinian's, the fourth-form girls manage to find out some of this news, then break into the Ministry to find out the rest. After the plane takes off, Culpepper Brown and Butters find that it is loaded with fourth-form girls, who eventually throw them, with parachutes and an inflatable raft, into the East Arabian Sea. They wind up on the same desert island as the other castaways. When the Ministry men mention they could see land when they were pushed from the plane, the whole group packs up and heads for Arabia and the nearest town, Makrab. At the army camp, the girls have been rounded up and confined, surrounded by barbed wire. The captain then receives news that the Ministry officials are in Makrab and is ordered to go there, with a back-up group of soldiers, to find them. When they leave, the girls use the liquor from the plane to get the remaining soldiers so drunk that they pass out, and take over the base. In Makrab, the Captain and Major find the Ministry group at a cafe. Culpepper Brown and Butters go of to find the British consul (Harold Berens), who pairs them with two girls, who get the men so drunk they pass out. When Harry notices "Lover Boy" on the street, he, Canford, Gates, the Captain and the Major follow him to a striptease club, where Harry recognises Rosalie on a poster advertising "Farida". That night they go to the club and find Rosalie who tells them that "Lover Boy" smuggled her off the boat, but the other girls are in danger, imprisoned at the palace of a local Emir (Elwyn Brook-Jones), whose sons want to marry them which, with Canford's collusion, had been O'Reilly's plan all along.

The officers go to muster their forces, while Harry and Canford go to visit the Emir. Gates gets there on her own and enters the palace by helping to carry in the laundry. To the Emir's displeasure, the girls are defending themselves quite well. Harry, Canford and Gates offer to reason with the girls, and are allowed to visit them for five minutes: when they can't provide results, the Emir's men attack again, again with little success. Just as this fight is ending, the army arrives but is promptly captured. Things look bleak, when they hear the St. Trinian's school song in the distance, followed by the arrival of the fourth-form girls in army vehicles, who smash their way into the compound, forcing the Emir and his forces to run away.

Back in Britain, the girls and Sgt. Gates are hailed as heroes. In Barset, Gates, after 16 years of being engaged, is about to get married, when the ceremony is interrupted with news that the girls are again burning down the school, and Kemp-Bird runs off, even as Gates is walking down the aisle. As the film ends, the staff at the Ministry and the officers at the East Arabian army camp are all doing a pastoral dance to calm themselves.

Cast

Cecil Parker as Professor Canford
George Cole as "Flash Harry"
Joyce Grenfell as Sergeant Ruby Gates
Eric Barker as Culpepper-Brown
Thorley Walters as Butters
Irene Handl as Headmistress Miss Harker-Packer
Dennis Price as Gore Blackwood
Sid James as Alphonse O'Reilly (nicknamed 'Wyatt Earp' by the girls)
Julie Alexander as Rosalie Dawn
Lloyd Lamble as Superintendent Kemp-Bird, the reluctant fiancé of Ruby Gates.
Raymond Huntley as the Judge
Nicholas Phipps as Major Hargreaves
Lisa Lee as Miss Brenner
John Le Mesurier as the Minister of Education
George Benson as Defence Counsel
Elwyn Brook-Jones as Emir
Basil Dignam as Army Officer
Cyril Chamberlain as Captain Thompson
Michael Ripper as Eric the liftman
Mark Dignam as Prosecuting Counsel
Monte Landis as Octavius
Warren Mitchell as Tailor
Clive Morton as V.I.P.
Wensley Pithey as Chief Constable
Bill Shine as Usher
Harold Berens as British Consul
Liz Fraser as WPC Susan Partridge
Maria Lennard as Millicent	 
Dawn Beret as Jane

Critical reception
Variety called it "well up to standard"; whereas Time Out regretted that "inspiration seems to have deserted the St Trinian's scriptwriters," but noted "Some bright moments."

References

External links

 St Trinians Net

1960 films
1960 comedy films
British black-and-white films
British comedy films
British sequel films
Films directed by Frank Launder
Films scored by Malcolm Arnold
Films set in schools
Films with screenplays by Frank Launder and Sidney Gilliat
St Trinian's films
1960s English-language films
1960s British films